In the mathematics of topological vector spaces, Minlos's theorem states that a cylindrical measure on the dual of a nuclear space is a Radon measure if its Fourier transform is continuous. It is named after Robert Adol'fovich Minlos and can be proved using Sazonov's theorem.

References
 

Theorems in functional analysis
Theorems regarding stochastic processes